Brianda Tamara Cruz Sandoval (born 21 December 1998) is a Mexican boxer. She won the bronze medal in the women's welterweight class at the 2019 Pan American Games in Lima. She also qualified for the 2020 Summer Olympics.

It is the first time that two national female boxers will compete in an Olympic Games.

References

1998 births
Living people
Sportspeople from Mazatlán
Mexican women boxers
Olympic boxers of Mexico
Boxers at the 2020 Summer Olympics
Medalists at the 2019 Pan American Games
Pan American Games medalists in boxing
Boxers at the 2019 Pan American Games
Welterweight boxers
Boxers from Sinaloa
Pan American Games bronze medalists for Mexico
20th-century Mexican women
21st-century Mexican women